For aquatic plants ornamental Venezuela means those commonly used and often in the aquarium Venezuela.

This listing is a partial list and sorted by families and genera in alphabetical form.

Acanthaceae 

 Hygrophila corymbosa Lindau  
 Hygrophila difformis Blume, 1826
 Hygrophila polysperma Anderson

Alismataceae
 Echinodorus bleheri Rataj en Preslia, 1970 
 Echinodorus berteroi (Spreng.) Fassett.
 Echinodorus bolivianum (Rusby) Lehtonen & Myllys. 
 Echinodorus cordifolius (L.) Griseb.
 Echinodorus floribundus (Seub.) Seub.
 Echinodorus grandiflorus (Cham. Et SHL.) Mich.
 Echinodorus grisebachii Smal.
 Echinodorus horizontalis Rataj. 
 Echinodorus longipetalus Micheli in A. & C. DC. >
 Echinodorus parviflorus Rataj, 1970
 Echinodorus subalatus Grisebach, 1866
 Echinodorus scraber Rataj, 1970
 Echinodorus tenellum (Mart. ex Schult. & Schult. f.) Britton.
 Echinodorus trialatus Fassett. 
 Sagittaria graminea Michx.

Araceae 

 Cryptocoryne affinis Brown,

Araliaceae 
 Hydrocotyle leucocephala Chamisso & Schlechtendal, 1826

Haloragaceae 
 Myriophyllum mattogrossense Hoenne, 1915

Primulaceae 
 Hottonia palustris Linnaeus, 1753

Hydrocharitaceae 
 Egeria densa Planchon, 1849
 Elodea canadensis Rich
 Elodea granatensis Rich
 Vallisneria americana Michx

Lythraceae 
 Rotala rotundifolia Koehne, 1849

Nymphaeaceae 

 Cabomba piauhyensis Gendenre, 1844
 Nymphaea amazonum  LINNAEUS  
 Nymphaea caerulea  ZUCC.   
 Nymphoides humboldtiana  (Kunth) Kuntze 
 Nymphaea lotus  LINNAEUS   
 Nymphaea micranta  Guill. & Perr.
 Nymphaea novogranatensis  Wiersema
 Victoria regia LINDL.

Onagraceae 
 Ludwigia erecta (L.) Hara
 Ludwigia helmintorrhiza (Mart.) Hara
 Ludwigia inclinata (L.f.) Raven  
 Ludwigia octovalvis (Jacq.) Raven  
 Ludwigia peploides Raven(H.B.K.)   
 Ludwigia repens J.R. Forst, 1849
 Ludwigia sedioides (H.& B.) Hara

Pteridaceae 
 Ceratopteris thalictroides Brogniart, 1821

Plantaginaceae 
 Bacopa caroliniana B.L. Robins,

Polypodiaceae 
 Microsorum pteropus Blume, 1933

Saururaceae 
 Saururus cernuus Linnaeus

Scrophulariaceae 
 Bacopa monnieri Pennell, 1891

References

Bibliography 
 Colonnelo, Giuseppe. (2004): Las planicies deltaicas del río Orinocoy el golfo de Paria: aspectos físicos y vegetación. En: Lasso, Carlos A. Alfonso, Leanne E., Flores, Ana Liz. y Love, Greg. (Editores). Evalución rápida de la biodiversidad y aspectos sociales de los ecosistemas acuáticos del delta del río Orinocoy goldo de Paria. Venezuela.  Boletín RAP de evaluación Biológica. 28:37-54.   
 Rial B, Anabel. (2001): el concepto de planta acautica en un humedal de los Llanos de Veenzuela. Memroria de la Fundación La Salle de Ciencias Naturales 155:119-132.
 Rosales, Judith., Bevilacqua, Mariapia., Díaz, Wilmer., Pérez, Rogelio., Rivas, Delfín. y Caura, Simón. (2003): Comunidades de vegetación ribereña  de la cuenca del río Caura. Estado Bolívar, Venezuela. En: Chernoff, Barry. Machado Allison, Antonio, Riseng, Karen and Montambault Jensen R. (Editores). Una evaluación rápida de los ecosistemas acuáticos de la cuenca del río Caura, estado Bolívar, Venezuela. Boletín RAP de evaluación Biológica. 28: 129-138. 
 Rosales, Judith., Bevilacqua, Mariapia., Díaz, Wilmer., Pérez, Rogelio., Rivas, Delfín. y Caura, Simón. (2003): Lista de las plantas colectads y observadas durante la Expedición AquaRAP a la cuenca del Río Caura  Estado Bolívar, Venezuela En: Chernoff, Barry. Machado Allison, Antonio, Riseng, Karen and Montambault Jensen R. (Editores). Una evaluación rápida de los ecosistemas acuáticos de la cuenca del río Caura, estado Bolívar, Venezuela. Boletín RAP de evaluación Biológica. 28: 129-138. 
 Velasquez, Justiniano. (1994): Plantas acuáticas vasculares de Venezuela. Universidad  Central de Venezuela. Caracas. 995p.

External links
 Aquatic-experts.com: Plantas de agua dulce
 Planta de acuario: references

Flora of Venezuela
Aquatic plants
Fishkeeping
Ornamental aquatic